Kiddushin is a masekhet or tractate of the Mishnah and the Talmud, and is part of the order of Nashim. The content of the tractate primarily deals with the legal provisions related to halakhic engagement and marriage.

In Jewish law, an engagement (kiddushin) is a contract between a man and a woman where they mutually promise to marry each other, and the terms on which it shall take place. The promise may be made by the intending parties or by their respective parents or other relatives on their behalf.

Structure 
Kiddushin consists of 4 chapters. It has 46 mishnahs and 82 pages gemara. It is included in both Talmuds.

According to Sherira Gaon in his letter, the first sugya (topic) in the Babylonian Talmud of Kiddushin is a Saboraic or Geonic addition and was not written by Amoraim like the rest of the Talmud. The sugya focuses on stylistic and grammatical issues that bear no halachic or aggadic implications. Nevertheless, Yitzchok Zilberstein ruled that one cannot make a siyum if he has not learned the opening sugya.

Chapter headings 
 Haisha Nikneis
 Haish Mekadeish
 Haomer
 Asara Yuchasin

References

External links 

 Tractate Kiddushin
 Mishnah Kiddushin text in Hebrew
 Full Hebrew and English text of the Mishnah for tractate Kiddushin on Sefaria
Full Hebrew and English text of the Talmud Bavli for tractate Kiddushin on Sefaria
Full Hebrew text of the Talmud Yerushalmi for tractate Kiddushin on Sefaria
Full Hebrew text of the Tosefta for tractate Kiddushin on Sefaria

Mishnah
Jewish marital law